Pleasant Township is a township in Coffey County, Kansas, United States. As of the 2000 census, its population was 272.

Geography
According to the USGS, it contains three cemeteries: Bailey, Baker and Strawn.

The streams of Buffalo Creek, Eagle Creek, Fourmile Creek, Jacobs Creek and Otter Creek run through this township.

Transportation
Pleasant Township contains one airport or landing strip, Burlington Municipal Airport.

References
 USGS Geographic Names Information System (GNIS)

External links
 US-Counties.com
 City-Data.com

Townships in Coffey County, Kansas
Townships in Kansas